Higher education in Hong Kong means any education higher than secondary education, including professional, technical, and academic. It is the highest level of education in Hong Kong, regulated under the Hong Kong Law.

Admission
Joint University Programmes Admissions System (JUPAS) is a scheme and the main route of application designed to assist students with Hong Kong Diploma of Secondary Education (HKDSE) or Hong Kong Advanced Level Examination (HKALE) results to apply for admission to the universities in Hong Kong.

Institutes
According to the Education Bureau, Hong Kong has 20 degree-awarding higher education institutions, including:

UGC funded universities
Below universities funded under the University Grants Committee (UGC):
The University of Hong Kong (HKU, founded in 1911) – University of Hong Kong Ordinance (Cap. 1053)
The Chinese University of Hong Kong (CUHK, founded in 1963) – The Chinese University of Hong Kong Ordinance (Cap. 1109)
The Hong Kong University of Science and Technology (HKUST, founded in 1991) – The Hong Kong University of Science and Technology Ordinance (Cap. 1141)
The Hong Kong Polytechnic University (PolyU, founded in 1937, granted university status in November 1994) – The Hong Kong Polytechnic University Ordinance (Cap. 1075)
City University of Hong Kong (CityU, founded in 1984, granted university status in November 1994) – City University of Hong Kong Ordinance (Cap. 1132)
Hong Kong Baptist University (HKBU, founded in 1956, granted university status in November 1994) – Hong Kong Baptist University Ordinance (Cap. 1126)
Lingnan University (LU, founded in 1967 as Lingnan School in Hong Kong, granted university status in July 1999) – Lingnan University Ordinance (Cap. 1165)
 The Education University of Hong Kong (EdUHK, founded in 1994, granted university status in May 2016) – The Education University of Hong Kong Ordinance (Cap. 444)

Self-financing institutions
Statutory university

Hong Kong Metropolitan University (HKMU; known as the Open University of Hong Kong, OUHK; founded in 1989, granted university status in May 1997) – The Open University of Hong Kong Ordinance (Cap. 1145)

Approved post secondary colleges

Approved post secondary colleges are educational institutes registered under the Post Secondary Colleges Ordinance (Cap. 320). This kind of colleges are allowed to give out academic awards at bachelor's degree level or above as well as to include the Chinese words ″學院″ or ″大學″, or the English word ″University″ in the registration name with prior approval from the Chief Executive-in-Council.

Hong Kong Shue Yan University (HKSYU, founded in 1971, granted university status in December 2006)
Hang Seng University of Hong Kong (HSUHK, founded in 2010, granted university status in October 2018)
Chu Hai College of Higher Education
HKCT Institute of Higher Education
Tung Wah College
Caritas Institute of Higher Education
Centennial College
Gratia Christian College
Hong Kong Nang Yan College of Higher Education
Technological and Higher Education Institute of Hong Kong, Vocational Training Council
UOW College Hong Kong

The publicly funded institution
Statutory institution 
 The Hong Kong Academy for Performing Arts (HKAPA, founded in 1984) – The Hong Kong Academy for Performing Arts Ordinance (Cap.1135)

Ranking

Notes:
UGC is the abbreviation of University Grants Committee.
HKCAAVQ is the abbreviation of Hong Kong Council for Accreditation of Academic and Vocational Qualifications (formerly HKCAA).
Programme Area Accreditation means the programme operator can operate specific programmes at designated subject areas and academic levels during specific period, granted and reviewed by HKCAAVQ. Prior notice and individual accreditation to HKCAAVQ are not required.
 Honour diploma (academically equivalent to higher diploma and associate degree in Hong Kong, and equivalent to bachelor's degree in some countries) was an academic award issued by colleges or institutes before they were granted full university status, such as HKBU, LU and SYU. It is no longer awarded.

See also
Medical education in Hong Kong
Joint University Programmes Admissions System
Self-financing Higher Education in Hong Kong

References

Further reading
French, N.J., (1999). The Reform of Higher Education in Hong Kong. In C.B. Teather (ed) Higher Education in a Post-binary Era: National Reforms and Institutional Responses (pp. 158–180) London: Jessica Kingsley Publishers, 1999.
Mok, K.H. (2001). Academic Capitalisation in the New Millennium: The Marketisation and Corporatisation of Higher Education in Hong Kong. Policy & Politics, 29(3), 299–315
Postiglione, G.A. (2002). The Transformation of Academic Autonomy in Hong Kong. In M.K. Chan and A.Y. So (eds.) Crisis and Transformation in China's Hong Kong (pp. 307–321). London : M.E. Sharpe.
Shive, G. (1992). Educational Expansion and the Labour Force. In G.A. Postiglione (ed) Education and Society in Hong Kong: Toward One Country and Two Systems (pp. 215–234). Hong Kong: HKU Press.
Sutherland, S. (2002). Higher Education in Hong Kong. Hong Kong: Research Grant Council.
Tang, H.H. (2010). "Higher Education Governance and Academic Entrepreneurialism in East Asia: The Two Episodes of Hong Kong and Macau". Research Studies in Education 8: 106–124..
University Grants Committee. (1996). Higher Education in Hong Kong: A Report by the Universities Grants Committee. Hong Kong: Government Printer.

External links
Education Bureau
University Grants Committee 
Hong Kong Council for Accreditation of Academic and Vocational Qualifications 
Dissertations and Theses Collections (DTC) 

 
Education in Hong Kong
Higher education in China